Canada-Swiss relations are foreign relations between Canada and Switzerland. Both countries are members of the Francophonie and the United Nations.

History
In 1604, during the colonization of Canada, Swiss soldiers in the service of the French army arrived to the territory of New France. Since the initial arrival, Canada has been a destination for Swiss emigrants. Switzerland's first honorary consulates in Canada were established in Montreal (1875), Toronto (1906), Vancouver and Winnipeg (1913). The two countries established diplomatic relations in 1945. In 1947, Switzerland opened a diplomatic legation in Ottawa and elevated it to an embassy in 1953. That same year, Canada upgraded its diplomatic legation in Bern to an embassy.

Canada is Switzerland's second most important economic partner in the Americas. In multilateral forums, the policies the two countries adopt tend to coincide, leading to mutually beneficial cooperation. There are direct flights between both nations with Air Canada, Edelweiss Air and Swiss International Air Lines.

Bilateral agreements
Both nations have signed several bilateral agreement such as a Treaty of Friendship, Commerce and Reciprocal Establishment (1914); Air Transport Agreement (1976); Cinematographic and Audiovisual Relations Agreement (1988); Cooperation Agreement for the Peaceful Uses of Nuclear Energy (1989); Mutual legal assistance treaty in criminal matters (1995); Social security convention, with arrangements with Quebec (1995); Extradition treaty (1996); and a Double taxation agreement (1998).

Resident diplomatic missions
 Canada has an embassy in Bern.
 Switzerland has an embassy in Ottawa and consulates-general in Montreal and Vancouver.

See also 
 Swiss Canadians

References

 
Switzerland 
Bilateral relations of Switzerland